Maryina roshcha may refer to:
 Maryina Roshcha District, a district in Moscow, Russia
 Maryina Roshcha Synagogue, a synagogue in Moscow
 Maryina Roshcha (Lyublinsko-Dmitrovskaya line), a station of the Moscow Metro, Line 10
 Maryina Roshcha (Bolshaya Koltsevaya line), a prospective station of the Bolshaya Koltsevaya line
 Maryina Roshcha railway station, a station of Moscow Central Diameters Line D2